Brian Mueller is an American ice hockey coach and former defenseman who was a two-time All-American for Clarkson.

Career
Mueller was drafted by the Hartford Whalers after a successful season of junior hockey and began attending Clarkson University the following fall. He arrived in Potsdam immediately after the Golden Knights' run to the frozen four, adding depth to the team as a freshman. Over the winter break, Mueller was also selected as a member of Team USA for the 1992 World Junior Championships. While he went scoreless in 7 games, he was part of the defensive corps that shut down opponents for 5 wins and enabled the US to win the bronze medal, just the second medal the team had earned in the 16-year history of the tournament.

For his sophomore season Mueller increased his point total and helped the Golden Knights win the conference tournament. unfortunately, for the second straight year, Clarkson flamed out in the opening round of the NCAA Tournament. In his first two seasons Mueller had been a stable defender for the Golden Knights but he turned into an offensive dynamo during his junior year. He finished second in the nation for scoring by defensemen and was named an All-American. Unfortunately for Mueller, Clarkson lost in the conference semifinal and ended up getting left out of the national tournament.

Mueller nearly repeated his offensive production as a senior but was able to help the team finish atop ECAC Hockey. Clarkson was again felled in the semifinal but they were able to secure a bid to the 1995 NCAA Tournament. The Golden Knights got a home game for the opening round, however, they were set against defending champion Lake Superior State. While the Lakers weren't as good as the year before, they were battle tested and the team managed to fight back against Clarkson and win a hard-fought road game 5–4.

After graduating, Mueller began his professional career spending most of his first two seasons with the Springfield Falcons. He headed to Europe in 1997 and spent most of the year with HPK before returning to North America. Mueller rounded out his career with a parts of two seasons in lower-level minor leagues and retired in 2000.

After his playing days were over, Mueller turned to coaching, working with junior players in Michigan Wisconsin and Illinois. He was named Vice President of Hockey operations for a program in the Chicago area and led teams to two national junior championships in 2012 and 2016. After the second title, Mueller was hired by the Pittsburgh Penguins as a head coach and executive director of the UPMC Lemieux Sports Complex Hockey Academy and continues to work in that role as of 2021.

Statistics

Regular season and playoffs

International

Awards and honors

References

External links

1972 births
Living people
Ice hockey coaches from New York (state)
People from Liverpool, New York
American men's ice hockey defensemen
Clarkson Golden Knights men's ice hockey players
AHCA Division I men's ice hockey All-Americans
Springfield Falcons players
Richmond Renegades players
Manitoba Moose players
Quebec Rafales players
Hershey Bears players
HC Thurgau players
HPK players
Saginaw Gears players
Port Huron Border Cats players
Detroit Vipers players
Hartford Whalers draft picks
Ice hockey players from New York (state)